The Horologion (Church Slavonic: Часocлoвъ, Chasoslov) or Book of hours provides the fixed portions (Greek: , akolouthiai) of the Divine Service or the daily cycle of services as used by the Eastern Orthodox and Eastern Catholic churches. Into this fixed framework of the services, are inserted numerous parts changing daily.

In its original sense, a horologion (Greek: ὡρολόγιον, "the hour-teller" from ὥρα hṓra "hour" and -λόγιον-logion, "teller") or Latin horologium was any device or structure for keeping time, such as a sundial or the Tower of the Winds in Athens.

Description

The Horologion is primarily a book for the use of the Reader and Chanters (as distinguished from the Euchologion, which contains the texts used by the Priest and Deacon). Several varieties of Horologia exist, the most complete of which is the Great Horologion (Greek: Ὡρολόγιον τò μέγα, Horologion to mega; Slavonic: Великий Часословъ, Velikij Chasoslov, Romanian: Ceaslovul Mare). It contains the fixed portions of the Daily Office (Vespers, Compline (Great and Small), Midnight Office, Matins, the Little Hours, the Inter-Hours, Typica, Prayers before Meals). The parts for the Reader and Chanters are given in full, the Priest's and Deacon's parts are abbreviated. The Great Horologion will also contain a list of Saints commemorated throughout the year (with their Troparia and Kontakia), selected propers for Sundays, and moveable Feasts (from the Menaion, Triodion and Pentecostarion), and various Canons and other devotional services. The Great Horologion is most commonly used in Greek-speaking churches.

Various editions of the Horologion are usually shorter; still giving the fixed portions of the Daily Office in full, but with the other texts much more abbreviated (all of which are found in full in the other liturgical books). In addition, such texts often also contain Morning and Evening Prayers, the Order of Preparation for Holy Communion, and Prayers to be said after receiving Holy Communion.

See also
 Agpeya
 Canonical hours

External links
Liturgy.io Horologion An online self-updating Horologion
Horologion For use at Reader's services (i.e., when a priest is not serving)
Horologion Texts in Word Format
Practical Tips on how to build a Liturgical Library
Photo of monks reading the Divine Office Church of the Holy Sepulchre, Jerusalem
 Byzantine Catholic Horologion

Eastern Orthodox liturgical books